The Equatoguinean Football Federation (FeGuiFut) is the governing body of football in Equatorial Guinea. It was founded in 1975, and affiliated to FIFA and to CAF in 1986. It organizes the national football league and the national team, as well as the women's national team and the national futsal team.

References

External links

Equatorial Guinea at the FIFA website.
Equatorial Guinea at the CAF website.

Equatorial Guinea
Football in Equatorial Guinea
Sports organizations established in 1957
Football